Elizabeth Sophia Tomlins (1763–1828) was an English novelist and occasional poet.

She was born in 1763. In 1797, her brother, later Sir Thomas Edlyne Tomlins (1762–1841), published Tributes of Affection by a Lady and her Brother (London, 8vo), a collection of short poems, most of them by her. Besides contributing several pieces to various periodical publications, she was the author of several novels, of which the most popular was The Victim of Fancy, an imitation of Goethe's Werther. Others were The Baroness d'Alunton, and Rosalind de Tracy, 1798, 12mo. She also translated the History of Napoleon Bonaparte from one of the works of Louis Pierre Anquetil. Tomlins died at The Firs, Cheltenham, on 8 August 1828 (Gent. Mag. 1828, ii. 471).

References

1763 births
1828 deaths
English women poets
18th-century English novelists
18th-century English women writers
18th-century English women
18th-century English people
19th-century English novelists
19th-century English women writers
19th-century English women
19th-century English people
Occasional poets